It All Falls Apart is the second full-length album from American ambient techno musician The Sight Below. It is the first album as a full collaboration between The Sight Below and former Slowdive and Lowgold drummer Simon Scott.

Track listing
 "Shimmer" – 6:14
 "Fervent" – 5:09
 "Through the Gaps in the Land" – 9:21
 "Burn Me Out from the Inside" – 6:07
 "It All Falls Apart" – 4:37
 "New Dawn Fades (Joy Division cover)" – 5:18 (feat. vocals Jesy Fortino)
 "Stagger" – 13:15

Credits
The Sight Below & Simon Scott – production, mixing, guitars, laptop, strings, brass, samplers, synthesizers, and vocals
Michael Cina – Artwork
Jesy Fortino – Vocals on "New Dawn Fades"

References

External links
"It All Falls Apart" @ Ghostly International

2010 albums
The Sight Below albums